La Prevoyante Stakes may refer to:

La Prevoyante Stakes (Gulfstream Park), a horse race held at Gulfstream Park
La Prevoyante Stakes (Woodbine Racetrack), a horse race held at Woodbine Racetrack